Smith Observatory and Dr. William R. Brooks House is a historic home and observatory located at Geneva in Ontario County, New York. Both structures were built in 1888.  The observatory is a small frame building consisting of a two-story tower flanked by two small wings.  The tower contains a 10-inch refracting telescope by Warner & Swasey of Cleveland, Ohio.  The east wing contains an intact meridian transit telescope and sidereal pendulum clock.  The house is a two-story brick dwelling with a broad range of intact, late Victorian eclectic features.

Brooks was a Professor of Astronomy at Hobart College, which owned the observatory until the late 20th century.

It was listed on the National Register of Historic Places in 2008.

See also
 List of astronomical observatories

References

External links
The Smith Observatory - Geneva, New York - Astronomical Observatories on Waymarking.com
Smith Observatory website

Houses on the National Register of Historic Places in New York (state)
Astronomical observatories in New York (state)
Houses completed in 1888
Houses in Ontario County, New York
Tourist attractions in Ontario County, New York
Geneva, New York
National Register of Historic Places in Ontario County, New York